La Leggenda di Wally is a 1930 Italian film, directed by Gian Orlando Vassallo. It stars Piero Pastore.

Cast
 Linda Pini as La Wally 
 Piero Pastore as Hagenbach 
 Laura Nucci

See also
 The Vulture Wally (1921)
 La Wally (1932, based on the opera)
 The Vulture Wally (1940)
 The Vulture Wally (1956)

References

External links
 

1930 films
1930s Italian-language films
Italian black-and-white films
Films based on German novels
Films set in Bavaria
Films set in the Alps
Italian silent films
1930s Italian films